White Station (also known as White or Whites) is a small unincorporated community located in Clay County, Mississippi, United States. The community is north of West Point.

White Station is the birthplace of blues musician Howlin' Wolf.

References

Unincorporated communities in Clay County, Mississippi
Unincorporated communities in Mississippi